SLO Transit is the provider of mass transportation in the city of San Luis Obispo, California. SLO Transit operates 10 vehicles at peak along eight fixed-routes within the 23 square miles of the city limits of San Luis Obispo and California Polytechnic State University (Cal Poly).  SLO Transit operates Monday to Friday approximately from 6am to 11pm, and Saturday and Sunday from 8am to 8pm.  

SLO Transit's ridership has increased steadily. It transports over 1.1 million riders annually. SLO Transit ridership demographics reflect a broad cross section of riders, including: seniors, people with disabilities, socially or economic transit dependent, K-12 students, college students, working professionals  and choice riders.  Operation and maintenance of all fixed-route services are contracted out to First Transit Inc., a third-party vendor.   

SLO Transit provides its fixed route transit system information via various formats, including: online at slotransit.org, printed materials, Google & Bing Maps, Social Media, “Bus Tracker” smart phone application, City Hall (990 Palm Street, San Luis Obispo), the Transit Center, Parks & Rec Facilities, County Library & Offices, San Luis Obispo Council of Governments office (SLOCOG), by phone, print advertising, on vehicles, at bus stops, community centers and via neighboring transit agencies (e.g., SLO RTA).

The public has direct access for participating in the improvements and management of SLO Transit services.  By direction of the City Council the Mass Transportation Committee (MTC) was formed in 1972 to provide them input on matters related to transit. The committee is an advisory body of citizen volunteers. Their purpose is to gather input and represent the general public on matters of setting priorities and to include input during the planning processes.  MTC advisory body includes representation from the: Senior, Disabled, Technical, Student and General community. 

SLO Transit has received many awards for its system including qualifying for Small Transit Intensive Cities (STIC) funding, a funding source only granted to cities that provide a greater level of service than which their city's population size would suggest.

For para-transit services, SLO Transit provides part of its funding allocation, off-the-top, to the county's consolidated para-transit service provider known as Run-About, operated by SLO Regional Transit Authority (SLO RTA), who also provides the fixed-route services to the other cities and parts of the county.

Gallery

Public transportation in San Luis Obispo County, California
San Luis Obispo, California
Bus transportation in California